1190 Pelagia, provisional designation , is a dark Nysian asteroid from the inner regions of the asteroid belt, approximately 17 kilometers in diameter. It was discovered on 20 September 1930, by Soviet–Georgian astronomer Grigory Neujmin at the Simeiz Observatory on the Crimean peninsula. The asteroid was named after astronomer Pelageya Shajn.

Classification and orbit 

Pelagia is a member of the Nysa family, a prominent family of the inner main-belt, named after 44 Nysa.

It orbits the Sun at a distance of 2.1–2.8 AU once every 3 years and 9 months (1,385 days). Its orbit has an eccentricity of 0.13 and an inclination of 3° with respect to the ecliptic.

Physical characteristics 

The asteroid has been characterized as an X-type asteroid by Pan-STARRS photometric survey.

Lightcurve 

In December 2010, a rotational lightcurve of Pelagia was obtained from photometric observations by Japanese astronomer couple Hiromi and Hiroko Hamanowa. Lightcurve analysis gave a well-defined rotation period of 2.3661 hours with a brightness amplitude of 0.08 magnitude.

While not being a fast rotator, the body has a notably short period for an asteroid of its size. Based on the lightcurve's low amplitude, it appears to have a rather spheroidal shape.

Diameter and albedo 

According to the surveys carried out by the Japanese Akari satellite and the NEOWISE mission of NASA's Wide-field Infrared Survey Explorer, Pelagia measures between 15.05 and 17.923 kilometers in diameter and its surface has an albedo between 0.031 and 0.067. The Collaborative Asteroid Lightcurve Link derives an albedo of 0.0486 and a diameter of 17.39 kilometers based on an absolute magnitude of 12.7.

Naming 

This minor planet was named in honor of Soviet–Russian astronomer Pelageya Shajn (1894–1956). In 1928, she discovered the asteroid 1112 Polonia and became the first female discoverer of minor planets. A second asteroid, 1648 Shajna, was also named in her and her husbands memory (Grigory Shajn).

References

External links 
 Asteroid Lightcurve Database (LCDB), query form (info )
 Dictionary of Minor Planet Names, Google books
 Asteroids and comets rotation curves, CdR – Observatoire de Genève, Raoul Behrend
 Discovery Circumstances: Numbered Minor Planets (1)-(5000) – Minor Planet Center
 
 

001190
Discoveries by Grigory Neujmin
Named minor planets
19300920